The 2014–15 Middle Tennessee Blue Raiders men's basketball team represented Middle Tennessee State University during the 2014–15 NCAA Division I men's basketball season. The Blue Raiders, led by 13th year head coach Kermit Davis, played their home games at the Murphy Center and were members of Conference USA. They finished the season 19–17, 9–9 in C-USA play to finish in sixth place. They advanced to the championship game of the C-USA tournament where they lost to UAB. They were invited to the CollegeInsider.com Tournament where they lost in the first round to Kent State.

Previous season 
The Blue Raiders finished the season 24–9, 13–3 in C-USA play to finish in a four way tie for the C-USA regular season championship. They advanced to the semifinals of the C-USA tournament where they lost to Tulsa. Despite their 24 wins and conference title, they did not participate in a post season tournament.

Departures

Recruiting class of 2014

Incoming Transfers

Roster

Schedule

|-
!colspan=9 style="background:#00407A; color:#FFFFFF;"| Exhibition

|-
!colspan=9 style="background:#00407A; color:#FFFFFF;"| Regular season

|-
!colspan=9 style="background:#00407A; color:#FFFFFF;"| Conference USA tournament

|-
!colspan=9 style="background:#00407A; color:#FFFFFF;"| CIT

References

Middle Tennessee Blue Raiders men's basketball seasons
Middle Tennessee
Middle Tennessee
Middle Tennessee Blue Raiders
Middle Tennessee Blue Raiders